Nicolás "Nico" Hidalgo García (born 30 April 1992) is a Spanish footballer who last played for Extremadura UD as a central midfielder.

Club career
Born in Motril, Granada, Andalusia, Nico graduated from Motril CF's youth setup, and made his senior debuts in the 2010–11 campaign, in Tercera División. On 25 June 2012 he moved to fellow league team Granada CF B, appearing regularly as his side were promoted to Segunda División B in his first season.

On 19 August 2014 Nico signed for Juventus F.C., being immediately loaned back to the Rojiblancos for one year. On 3 December he made his first team debut, replacing fellow debutant Daniel Larsson in the 71st minute of a 1–0 home win against Córdoba CF, for the campaign's Copa del Rey.

On 15 July 2016, Nico was loaned to Segunda División club Cádiz CF, for one year. The following 15 March, he agreed to a permanent two-year deal with the club, effective as of 1 July.

On 26 August 2018, after being sparingly used, Hidalgo was loaned to third division side Racing de Santander for the season. The following 23 July, after achieving promotion to the second division, he signed a permanent contract with the club.

On 11 August 2020, after suffering immediate relegation, Hidalgo joined fellow relegated side Extremadura UD.

References

External links

1992 births
Living people
People from Motril
Sportspeople from the Province of Granada
Spanish footballers
Footballers from Andalusia
Association football midfielders
Segunda División B players
Tercera División players
Motril CF players
Club Recreativo Granada players
Granada CF footballers
Cádiz CF players
Racing de Santander players
Extremadura UD footballers
Juventus F.C. players